The All India Congress Committee (AICC) is the presidium or the central decision-making assembly of the Indian National Congress. It is composed of members elected from state-level Pradesh Congress Committees and can have as many as a thousand members. It is the AICC that elects members of the Congress Working Committee and the Congress President, who is also the head of the AICC. The organisational executives of the AICC are several general-secretaries selected by the Congress President and the members of the Congress Working Committee.

History
Basically the Original headquarters of AICC were located at Swaraj Bhavan, Allahabad, however after independence of India in 1947, it was shifted to 7, Jantar Mantar Marg, near Jantar Mantar, Delhi and subsequently to 24 Akbar Road, right behind 10 Janpath, after the 1969 Congress split, under Indira Gandhi.

Today, its institutional records are part of the Archives at the Nehru Memorial Museum & Library, at Teen Murti House, Delhi.

Organisation

The Organisation is headed by the Congress President, who is elected by the All India Congress Committee. The AICC on the other hand is composed of delegates sent by the various State–level Pradesh Congress Committees, who themselves have been elected or nominated to their respective Pradesh Congress Committee from the district and panchayat level party units. Besides the President, these delegates also elect the Congress Working Committee, which is the apex decision making body of the organisation. Several General Secretaries are also appointed by the President to run the functioning of the organisation.

AICC office bearers

President

Treasurer

General secretaries

In-Charges

Secretaries with assigned work

Joint Secretaries

Departments

Communication Department

Senior Spokespersons

Spokespersons

Congress in Pradesh (States)

 Andaman and Nicobar PCC
 Andhra Pradesh PCC
 Arunachal Pradesh PCC
 Assam PCC
 Bihar PCC
 Chhattisgarh PCC
 Dadra and Nagar Haveli PCC
 Daman and Diu PCC
 Delhi PCC
 Goa PCC
 Gujarat PCC
 Haryana PCC
 Himachal Pradesh PCC
 Jammu & Kashmir PCC
 Jharkhand PCC
 Karnataka PCC
 Kerala PCC
 Lakshadweep PCC
 Madhya Pradesh PCC
 Maharashtra PCC
 Manipur PCC
 Meghalaya PCC
 Mizoram PCC
 Nagaland PCC
 Orissa PCC
 Pondicherry PCC
 Punjab PCC
 Rajasthan PCC
 Sikkim PCC
 Tamil Nadu PCC
 Telangana PCC
 Tripura PCC
 Uttarakhand PCC
 Uttar Pradesh PCC
 West Bengal PCC

See also
 Indian National Congress
 Congress Working Committee
 Pradesh Congress Committee
 National Executive of the Bharatiya Janata Party
 Politburo of the Communist Party of India (Marxist)

Footnotes

References

External links
 Official All India Congress Committee website 

Indian National Congress